Eleftheres is a village and a former municipality in the Kavala regional unit, East Macedonia and Thrace, Greece. Since the 2011 local government reform it is part of the municipality Pangaio, of which it is a municipal unit. The municipal unit has an area of 150.555 km2. The seat of the municipality was Nea Peramos. The other villages in this municipal unit are Agios Andreas, Eleftheres, Elaiochori, Folia, Myrtofyto and Nea Iraklitsa.

According to the statistics of Vasil Kanchov ("Macedonia, Ethnography and Statistics"), 300 Greek Christians and 300 Greek Muslims lived in the village in 1900.

References

Φώτης Ο.Ε., ΕΛΛΑΣ οδικοί-τουριστικοί χάρτες, 33rd edition, 2005.

Populated places in Kavala (regional unit)